Kirichenko is a gender-neutral Ukrainian surname.

People

Kirichenko
 Aleksandr Kirichenko (born 1967), Ukrainian track cyclist
 Alexei Kirichenko (1908–1975), Soviet politician
 Dmitri Kirichenko (born 1977), Russian footballer and coach
 Evgenia Kirichenko (1931–2021), Ukrainian-Russian historian
 Irina Kirichenko (born 1937), Soviet sprint cyclist
 Olga Kirichenko (born 1976), Ukrainian swimmer
 Serhiy Kirichenko (born 1952), Ukrainian military leader
 Vadim Kirichenko (born 1936), Soviet footballer and manager

See also
 Kyrychenko
 
 

Ukrainian-language surnames